Keith Russell Judd (born May 23, 1958) is an American convicted criminal and perennial candidate for political office. His nicknames include "Dark Priest" and "Mtr. President".  He claims to have run for President of the United States in every election since 1996.

Early life
Judd was born May 23, 1958, in Pasadena, California.  He is married, and professes to be a Rasta-Christian.  He claims to have run in every United States presidential election since 1996 and for mayor of Albuquerque, New Mexico, and Governor of New Mexico. He further claims to be a former member of the Federation of Super Heroes. Judd has one child, born on September 3, 1990, a son named Marcus Miciah Robertson.

Crime
In 1999 Judd was convicted of two counts of "mailing a threatening communication with intent to extort money or something of value" and sentenced to 210 months (17½ years) in federal prison. The conviction has been falsely connected to litigation involving the University of New Mexico which was a civil rights complaint he initiated. His actual crime involved postcards that stated "Send the money back now, Keith Judd, Last Chance or Dead." and a package containing a semen stained Playboy, a knife inside the magazine, a key chain, and his father's military discharge papers. He also sent letters to jurors after his trial. He has appealed his conviction no fewer than 36 times, but each appeal has been dismissed for various reasons.

Judd was released in June 2013 on a supervised release program. In October, his probation office sought a warrant for his arrest for violating the terms of his supervision. He was sentenced to 12 months in prison, with another 24 months of supervised release. He has since been released a second time under supervision.

Presidential candidacies
As a perennial candidate, Judd has thrice run for president in the Democratic Party's primaries, in 2008, 2012 and 2016. Each time Judd has managed to qualify to be included on the ballot of at least one Democratic Party primary or caucus.

2008 Democratic presidential primary campaign
In the 2008 Presidential election he filed to run as a Democrat in 14 states but only appeared on the ballot in Idaho.

Judd finished third in the May 27, 2008, non-binding Idaho Democratic presidential preference primary with 1.7 percent of the vote, behind Barack Obama and Hillary Clinton. No delegates to the Democratic National Convention were at stake in the primary as Idaho's delegation was determined at the February 5 Democratic caucus, which Judd unsuccessfully contested.

Below is a table of Judd's performance in the primaries.

2012 Democratic presidential primary campaign

Judd filed to run for president again in the 2012 general election. Running again for the Democratic nomination, Judd only qualified for ballot status in the West Virginia primary. On May 8, 2012, Judd won 41% of the vote in the against incumbent Barack Obama, a higher percentage of the vote in one state than any other primary opponent of Obama had hitherto achieved in 2012 (a figure later surpassed by John Wolfe, Jr.'s showing in the Arkansas primary).  While this showing would normally have entitled Judd to delegates at the 2012 Democratic National Convention, state officials expressed some uncertainty as to whether Judd had completed the required formalities, such as filing a slate of delegates and completing paperwork. Judd, who did not qualify for any other primary ballots, contested the ballot count, alleging that ballot workers suppressed the actual total (which he said showed him in the lead) in an effort to cover up an Obama loss.

Below is a table of Judd's performance in the primaries.

2016 Democratic presidential primary campaign

Judd sent a handwritten note to the FEC announcing his 2016 presidential candidacy as a Democrat on August 16, 2014.  He filed his official documents with the FEC in September 2015. As of January 1, 2016, Judd had been officially added to the ballot in the Louisiana, Missouri, New Hampshire, Oklahoma, and Texas Democratic Primaries.  On January 12, 2016, Judd's paperwork was filed to be on the primary ballot in West Virginia.

Below is a table of the primaries Judd competed in, and his performance in them.

References

External links
 Judd's Site at Voice for Inmates

1958 births
Living people
American extortionists
American prisoners and detainees
People from Pasadena, California
Prisoners and detainees of the United States federal government
Candidates in the 2008 United States presidential election
Candidates in the 2012 United States presidential election
21st-century American politicians
Candidates in the 2016 United States presidential election
New Mexico Democrats